Derek David Hales (born 15 December 1951) is an English former footballer who played as a striker.

He is the all-time leading goalscorer for Charlton Athletic, with his most prolific season being 1975–76, when he scored 28 league goals and was leading scorer in the Football League Second Division. He is also famous for an on-field fight with teammate Mike Flanagan during an FA Cup tie against Maidstone in 1979.  After running a pub in his native village Lower Halstow, he was employed at the Howard School in Gillingham.

References
General

Specific

1951 births
Living people
People from the Borough of Swale
English footballers
Association football forwards
Gillingham F.C. players
Dartford F.C. players
Luton Town F.C. players
Charlton Athletic F.C. players
Derby County F.C. players
West Ham United F.C. players
English Football League players